Symonanthus is a genus of flowering plants belonging to the family Solanaceae. The genus was circumscribed by Laurence Arnold Robert Haegi in Telopea vol.2 on page 175 in 1981.

The genus name of Symonanthus is in honour of David Eric Symon (1920–2011), who was an Australian botanist and taxonomist, from the University of Adelaide and Waite Agricultural Research Institute. He help develop the Waite Arboretum as well.

Species
As accepted by Kew:
Symonanthus aromaticus 
Symonanthus bancroftii

References

 
Solanaceae genera
Flora of Western Australia